The 1942 Rutgers Queensmen football team represented Rutgers University in the 1942 college football season. In February 1942, following the Japanese attack on Pearl Harbor, Rutgers head coach Harman, who had led the team to a 26-7-1 record from 1938 to 1941, joined the United States Navy. In April 1942, Harry Rockafeller, who had coached the team from 1927 to 1930, resumed responsibility as Rutgers' head football coach. In their fifth, non-consecutive season under head coach Harry Rockafeller, the Queensmen compiled a 3–4–1 record and were outscored by their opponents 113 to 100.

Schedule

References

Rutgers
Rutgers Scarlet Knights football seasons
Rutgers Queensmen football